Gemma Cuervo Igartua (born 22 June 1936) is a Spanish TV, cinema and theatre actress.

Biography
Her best known works are her roles in the TV programs Estudio 1, Médico de familia and Aquí no hay quien viva. She also worked in La que se avecina as María Teresa Valverde until the fourth season in 2010.

She started her career in the Teatro Español Universitario and made her professional debut with Adolfo Marsillach in Harvey. She worked later in the José Tamayo's Cía. Lope de Vega, and in 1969 her husband and she created their own theatre company, where they made performances in several towns in Spain and in other countries.

Personal life

She was married to the actor Fernando Guillén in 1960 and they had three children: Fernando, Cayetana and Natalia.

Filmography 

 Íntimos (2005)
 El sueño de una noche de San Juan (2005) (voz)
 La mirada violeta (2004)
 Pacto de brujas (2003)
 Aquí no hay Quien Viva (2003)
 Em dic Sara (1999)
 Si lo sé no vengo (a mi propio entierro) (1999)
 ¡Qué vecinos tan animales! (1998) (voz)
 Best-Seller: El premio (1996)
 Amor e Dedinhos de Pé (1993)
 Boom boom (1990)
 Father Cami's Wedding (1979)
 Tres en raya (1979)
 Partenaire (1978)
 Two Men and Two Women Amongst Them (1977)
 Adulterio a la española (1976)
 Secuestro (1976)
El adúltero (1975)
Odio a mi cuerpo (1974)
Señora doctor (1973)
Las colocadas (1972)
Historia de una chica sola (1972)
La primera entrega (1971)
Vente a Alemania, Pepe (1971)
Rain for a Dusty Summer (1971)
Los chicos del Preu (1967)
 Camerino Without a Folding Screen (1967)
 Agent X-77 Orders to Kill (1966)
La dama de Beirut (1965)
El mundo sigue (1965)
Perché uccidi ancora (1965)
Vivir al sol (1965)
El escándalo (1964)
La vida es maravillosa (1956)

References

External links

1936 births
Living people
Actresses from Barcelona
Spanish film actresses
Spanish stage actresses
Spanish television actresses
20th-century Spanish actresses
21st-century Spanish actresses